And Now the Screaming Starts! is a 1973 British gothic horror film directed by Roy Ward Baker and starring Peter Cushing, Herbert Lom, Patrick Magee, Stephanie Beacham and Ian Ogilvy. It is one of the few feature-length horror stories by Amicus, a company best known for anthology or "portmanteau" films. Baker felt the title was "silly".

The screenplay, written by Roger Marshall, is based on the 1970 novella Fengriffen by David Case. The film is also known as Fengriffen or Bride of Fengriffen.

Plot
The film begins in 1795. After moving to her fiancé Charles Fengriffen's (Ogilvy) family estate, Catherine (Beacham) experiences terrifying visions of an undead corpse with a heavily birthmarked face, empty eye sockets and a severed right hand. On her wedding night, she is attacked and raped by an evil spirit in the bedroom of Fengriffen House. Later, she is disturbed to encounter Silas, a woodsman who lives in a lodge on the estate and has a birthmark identical to that of the corpse. Charles and others are reluctant to tell her anything about Silas, and those who show a willingness to answer her questions are killed in bizarre circumstances: Maitland, Charles' solicitor, is hacked to death with an axe; Mrs Luke, the housemaid, is thrown down the stairs; and Aunt Edith, Catherine's chaperone, is strangled by the severed hand, which then vanishes.

Announcing that Catherine is pregnant, physician Dr. Whittle urges Charles to tell her the story of the estate's dark past, but Charles refuses, believing it to be nothing more than a legend. Deciding that Catherine's visions are the result of mental illness, he instead sends for Dr. Pope, a specialist in psychiatric disorders. Pope approaches the mystery with an open mind and almost forces the truth out of Whittle, but before Whittle can speak, the hand rematerialises, strangles him, and vanishes again. Pope confronts Charles, who cautiously recounts the crimes of his debauched grandfather, Sir Henry Fengriffen: some 50 years earlier, Henry raped the bride of his servant, Silas – whose son, the woodsman, is the spitting image of his father – and then cut off the enraged Silas' right hand as punishment for trying to kill him. In revenge, Silas cursed the Fengriffens, vowing that the next virgin bride to enter Fengriffen House would be raped and her child tainted, while all those attempting to warn her would die. Henry later showed remorse and bequeathed Silas land, where the son has remained to watch his dead father's threat come to fruition. As Charles' mother was a widow before she married Charles' father, Catherine is the first virgin bride to arrive at the estate since the curse was placed.

Pope agrees to stay with the Fengriffens until their baby is born. When Catherine goes into labour, he sedates her and delivers the child. Repulsed by the newborn's appearance, Charles rushes over to Silas' lodge and shoots the triumphant woodsman in the face with a pair of pistols. Pope follows and finds Silas dead on the floor with a shot through each eye, matching the corpse seen by Catherine. The furious Charles then sets about smashing open his grandfather's grave, beating Pope away when the doctor tries to stop him. As Charles destroys Henry's skeletal remains, Pope returns to Catherine and presents her child – which, like the older Silas, has a birthmarked face and no right hand. The camera zooms in on Catherine's tear-streaked face and the end credits roll.

Cast

 Peter Cushing as Dr Pope
 Herbert Lom as Sir Henry Fengriffen
 Patrick Magee as Dr Whittle
 Stephanie Beacham as Catherine Fengriffen
 Ian Ogilvy as Charles Fengriffen
 Geoffrey Whitehead as Woodsman / Silas
 Guy Rolfe as Lawyer Maitland
 Rosalie Crutchley as Mrs Luke
 Gillian Lind as Aunt Edith
 Janet Key as Bridget
 Sally Harrison as Sarah

Production

Filming locations
The large gothic house used in the film is Oakley Court, near Bray village, which is now a four-star hotel.

Release

Reception
The film received a lukewarm reception in Britain and America on its release. In the UK, And Now the Screaming Starts! went out on a double bill with the American horror film, Doctor Death: Seeker of Souls. Jonathan Rosenbaum of Monthly Film Bulletin praised Denys Coop's camerawork and the acting performances, yet felt the film never quite realised its potential. A. H. Weiler reviewing the work in The New York Times commended Cushing's contribution, deeming it superior to the rest of the cast's, although considered its plot contrived. Mark Burger, reviewing a home video release for the Winston-Salem Journal in 2002, similarly noted the strong cast but found the muddled screenplay led to a merely "watchable" film. In a review published in 2006, Stuart Galbraith IV called the film "only fitfully effective", criticising what he considered a lack of character development: "the film parades one series of strange-goings-on and other horror set pieces after another, but without compelling characters to hang them on they just don't make much of an impact."

Citations

Further reading
 Chibnall, Steve; Petley, Julian (ed.) (2005). British Horror Cinema. Oxford: Taylor & Francis, pp. 132–134. 
 Mayer, Geoff (2004). Roy Ward Baker (British Film Makers). Manchester Univ. Press.

External links
 
 
 
 
 

1970s ghost films
1970s supernatural horror films
1973 films
1973 horror films
Amicus Productions films
British films about revenge
British ghost films
British pregnancy films
British supernatural horror films
1970s English-language films
Films set in 1795
Films about curses
Films based on horror novels
Films directed by Roy Ward Baker
Films scored by Douglas Gamley
Films set in country houses
Films shot in Berkshire
British rape and revenge films
British exploitation films
1970s British films